The List of postal rates in the British Mandate of Palestine are the postal rates in effect in Palestine under military occupation British and allied forces and later civil administration of the British Mandate of Palestine between 1917 and 1948. During the Mandate, postal services were provided by British authorities.

After occupation by allied forces in 1917, basic postage was free for civilians. Registration fees and parcels had to be franked using British or Indian stamps. Once the EEF stamps printed in Cairo came on sale, mail to overseas destinations had to be paid for from 10 February 1918, and from 16 February 1918 also mail to the then occupied territories and Egypt.

The structure of postal rates followed broadly British practice and new services, like airmail and express delivery, were added over the years. From 1926 reduced rates applied for mail to Britain and Ireland, and from 1 March 1938 to 4 September 1939, Palestine was part of the All Up Empire airmail rates system.

Postal rates

See also
Postage stamps and postal history of Palestine
Postage stamps and postal history of Israel
Post offices in the British Mandate of Palestine

References

Sources
 Bale : the stamps of Palestine Mandate 1917–1948, 9th ed. (2000). Joseph D. Stier (ed.). Chariot. .
 Proud, Edward B. (2006). The postal history of Palestine and Transjordan. Heathfield. . First edition (1985): The postal history of British Palestine 1918-1948.

History of the Middle East
Mandatory Palestine
Mandatory Palestine-related lists